The name for a legendary plant based upon a real plant.

Vegetable Lamb of Tartary -- the legend
Cibotium barometz -- the plant